Associação Desportiva Guarujá, commonly known as Guarujá, is a currently inactive Brazilian football club based in Guarujá, São Paulo.

History 
The club was founded on December 1, 1992, with the help of Guarujá city hall, after Esporte Clube Benfica folded.

Stadium 

Associação Desportiva Guarujá play their home games at Estádio Municipal Antônio Fernandes. The stadium has a maximum capacity of 6,840 people.

References 

Association football clubs established in 1992
Football clubs in São Paulo (state)
1992 establishments in Brazil